The 1911 Ohio State Buckeyes football team was an American football team that represented Ohio State University during the 1911 college football season.  In their first season under head coach Harry Vaughan, the Buckeyes compiled a 5–3–2 record and outscored their opponents by a combined total of 47 to 42.

Schedule

References

Ohio State
Ohio State Buckeyes football seasons
Ohio State Buckeyes football